The Frederick Nance House, also known as Oak Grove, is a historic house at 931 Jessica Avenue in Newberry, South Carolina.  The brick plantation house was built c. 1822–25 on land owned by Frederick Nance, a prominent local politician who had served as Lieutenant Governor of South Carolina 1808–10.  The house is a virtually intact example of antebellum plantation architecture, and is accompanied by a somewhat rare local example of a surviving slave quarters.  The house's design has been attributed to Robert Mills.

The property was listed on the National Register of Historic Places in 2014.

See also
National Register of Historic Places listings in Newberry County, South Carolina

References

Houses on the National Register of Historic Places in South Carolina
Houses completed in 1825
Houses in Newberry County, South Carolina
National Register of Historic Places in Newberry County, South Carolina
Slave cabins and quarters in the United States